Viktor Kurmanovych (26 November 1876, Velyka Vilshanytsia near Zolochiv, Galicia and Lodomeria, Austro-Hungary – 18 October 1945, Odessa, Soviet Union) was a Ukrainian politician and military leader.

Kurmanovych was born into a family of the Greek Catholic priest in the village of Velyka Vilshanytsia in Galicia. After the local elementary school, he was enrolled into the Infanteriekadettenschule Lobzow (Cadet school). Upon graduating from the cadet school, Kurmanovych studied at the Austrian Military Academy in Vienna which he finished in 1912. His first assignment was in the Headquarters of General Staff of the Austrian Army, where he served in the department of intelligence. In 1914, Kurmanovych was caught by the Russian operatives for spying and imprisoned. Soon in 1915, he was exchanged for some Russian officer and commissioned some Austrian units on the Italy and Bokovyna front-lines until 1918. With the fall of the Austro-Hungarian Empire, Kurmanovych pledged his allegiance to the government of West Ukraine.

Kurmanovych was appointed the commander of the Zhovkva Group of Halych Army (HA) and later the Southern Group. After a short while he was included to the Supreme Command of HA and promoted to colonel. Kurmanovych served as the Chief of Staff from February 13 - June 7, 1919 simultaneously performing duties of a State Secretary. When the Halych Army was forced beyond the Zbruch river, Kurmanovych's units joined the Ukrainian People's Army and he was promoted to Brigadier General.  On August 11, 1919 he became the Quartermaster General at the General Bulawa (Military Council). However, Kurmanovych ran into disagreements with other military specialists in the Headquarters as well as the ongoing typhus epidemic, in September he left for Baden bei Wien, in Austria.

In 1921-1922, Kurmanovych was interned in Deutsch Gabel (Sudetenland). In 1923 he worked at the automobile factory. Kurmanovych cooperated with Mykola Kapustiansky to organize the Organization of Ukrainian Nationalists (OUN). From 1933 to 1938 he lived in Free City of Danzig, after that moved to the Carpathian Ukraine. In April 1945 Kurmanovych was arrested by the Soviet military counter-intelligence SMERSH and transferred to the Soviet Union. He died in the NKVD prison hospital of Odessa.

References

Aleksander Kolańczuk - "Ukraińscy generałowie w Polsce, emigranci polityczni w latach 1920-1939. Słownik biograficzny", Przemyśl 2009, 

1876 births
1945 deaths
People from Lviv Oblast
People from the Kingdom of Galicia and Lodomeria
Ukrainian Austro-Hungarians
Ukrainian diplomats
Ukrainian nationalists
Ukrainian people of World War I
Austro-Hungarian military personnel of World War I
Ukrainian Galician Army people
Ukrainian people of the Polish–Ukrainian War
Generals of the Ukrainian People's Republic
Ukrainian politicians before 1991
Organization of Ukrainian Nationalists politicians
Ukrainian people who died in Soviet detention